Máté Tóth may refer to:

 Máté Tóth (footballer, born 1991), Hungarian footballer for Vasas SC
 Máté Tóth (footballer, born 1998), Hungarian footballer for Szombathelyi Haladás